The mid-sized Praga Lady car was built in eight series and replaced the Piccolo 307. First introduced in 1935, it continued to be built until 1947. It was most common as a four-door saloon but also available with two doors or as a convertible and pick-up truck. A variety of ambulance versions were also built. The first series (1935-1937) was also available as a two-seat roadster, bodied by Oldřich Uhlík in Prague.

It was based on the Piccolo 307. Bodywork consisted of a wooden frame covered by sheet metal. This engine has an aluminium head of Ricardo's "turbulent head" design and Bohnalite pistons.

The bodywork consisted of steel mounted on a wooden frame and received frequent updates. The car had a traditional X-frame but was unusual in having an independent front suspension and a central lubrication system. These often proved troublesome and were usually disconnected after a few years. About 4600 had been built when production was halted in 1941. The car re-entered production after the end of World War II, with about 400 more being built. The now nationalized concern built this small series for official use. Praga proceeded to concentrate exclusively on trucks and buses.

References

Cars of the Czech Republic
Praga vehicles
Cars introduced in 1935